Percy Anderson may refer to:

Percy Anderson (designer) (1851–1928), English stage designer and painter
Percy Anderson (judge) (born 1948), United States District Judge
Percy McCuaig Anderson (1879–1948), Saskatchewan lawyer, judge and political figure

See also 

 Perry Anderson
 Percy Henderson